Kade Weston (born November 29, 1986) is a former American football nose tackle. He was drafted by the New England Patriots in the seventh round of the 2010 NFL Draft. He played college football at Georgia.

Early years
Weston attended Red Bank Regional High School in Little Silver, New Jersey, where he played football, basketball, and was a thrower for the track team. Weston's first year of organized football was 2001 as a high school freshman. As a junior, he recorded 114 tackles, 20 tackles for a loss, 14 sacks, and five forced fumbles, helping Red Bank to a 10–2 record and berth in the Central Jersey Group III State Championship. In his senior season, Weston made 79 tackles and eight sacks, earning all-state honors for a second straight season. He was ranked in Rivals.com's Top 100 national players and was the third-ranked defensive tackle nationally by Scout.com. He was named to Parade magazine's All-American team.

College career
Following high school, Weston attended the University of Georgia, where he redshirted in 2005. As a freshman in 2006, Weston appeared in every game and made six starts, recording 12 quarterback hurries. He was named to the Southeastern Conference All-Freshman team and the national All-Freshman team by The Sporting News following the season. In 2007, Weston played in 13 games, making five starts, and finished the season with 19 tackles. In his junior season in 2008, Weston appeared in ten games and had 18 tackles. As a senior in 2009, Weston started 9 of the 12 games he appeared in, recording 28 tackles and two sacks. Following the season, he was named to the All-SEC third-team.

Professional career

New England Patriots
Weston was drafted by the New England Patriots in the seventh round (248th overall) of the 2010 NFL Draft. He signed a four-year contract on July 21, 2010. He was waived/injured on August 23, 2010. He cleared waivers the next day and reverted to the team's injured reserve list.

On August 29, 2011, he was waived by the Patriots.

Indianapolis Colts
Weston was signed to the Indianapolis Colts' practice squad on October 5, 2011.

References

External links
New England Patriots bio
Georgia Bulldogs bio

1986 births
Living people
American football defensive ends
Canadian football defensive linemen
American football defensive tackles
American players of Canadian football
Edmonton Elks players
Georgia Bulldogs football players
Indianapolis Colts players
New England Patriots players
People from Little Silver, New Jersey
People from Arima
Pittsburgh Steelers players
Players of American football from New Jersey
Red Bank Regional High School alumni
Sportspeople from Monmouth County, New Jersey
Trinidad and Tobago players of American football